Michael Sacco (born February 14, 1937) is an American labor leader from Brooklyn, New York.  He was appointed as the president of the Seafarers International Union of North America, AFL-CIO in June 1988 by the SIUNA Executive Board.

Since 1988, Sacco has also served as president of The Maritime Trades Department AFL-CIO, a post he was re-elected to in 2009. In November, 1991, he was elected a vice-president of the AFL-CIO.

He served in the U.S. Air Force from 1954 to 1958. In 1958, he joined SIU.  From 1968 to 1979 he was vice president of the Seafarers Harry Lundeberg School of Seamanship, the union's vocational training facility in Piney Point, Maryland.

From 1980 to 1988, Sacco was vice president of the SIUNA-affiliated Seafarers International Union; Atlantic, Gulf, Lakes and Inland Waters District. He was also secretary-treasurer of the Greater St. Louis Area and Vicinity Port Council and an executive board member of the Missouri State AFL-CIO.

Sacco is married and has four children.

See also

 Paul Hall (labor leader)
 Harry Lundeberg
 Seafarers International Union of North America

References

External links
 Seafarers International Union - Official website
 http://maritimesecurity.blogstream.com/

Seafarers International Union of North America people
People from Brooklyn
1937 births
Living people
Trade unionists from New York (state)